Vráž is a municipality in Písek District in the South Bohemian Region of the Czech Republic. It has about 300 inhabitants.

Administrative part
The municipality is made up of villages of Jistec, Nová Vráž and Stará Vráž.

References

Villages in Písek District